A cliff is a vertical, or near vertical, rock exposure.

Cliff, The Cliff or The Cliffs may also refer to:

Buildings
Cliff Brewery, a former brewery near Ipswich, England
Cliff Palace, largest cliff dwelling in North America
The Cliffs, a historic house in Philadelphia, Pennsylvania
Cargill's Castle in Dunedin, New Zealand, formally known as The Cliffs

Places
Cliff, Kentucky, an unincorporated community
Cliff, Lewis, a settlement in the Outer Hebrides, Scotland
Cliff Village, Missouri, a small village
Cliff, New Mexico, an unincorporated community
Cliff Township, Custer County, Nebraska
The Cliff, Salford, a residential area in the City of Salford, England

Geographic features
Cliff Island, Maine, an island
Lake Cliff, a freshwater lake in Dallas, Texas
Cliff Mountain (New York), a 3944-foot mountain

People and fictional characters
Cliff (surname), a list of people
Cliff (given name), a list of people and fictional characters

Entertainment
Cliff Sings, second album by British Cliff Richard and his first studio album
The Cliff, an EP by Pelican
"The Cliff" (song), Russian song by Alexander Navrotsky, famously performed by Leonid Kharitonov in 1965.
Cliff (album), (1959) debut album by Cliff Richard
"The Cliff", a short story by Charles Baxter (author)
"Cliffs", a 2018 track by Toby Fox from Deltarune Chapter 1 OST from the video game Deltarune

Cyclones
Cyclone Cliff (1981), struck Queensland on February 14, 1981
Cyclone Cliff (1992), South Pacific cyclone; did not make landfall
Cyclone Cliff (2007), South Pacific cyclone; caused severe damage on Fiji

Other uses
Cliff College, a Christian theological college in Derbyshire
The Cliff (Emory), a shuttle bus system at Emory University near Atlanta
Cliff mine, a defunct copper mine in Michigan
The Cliff (training ground), a sports ground in Salford, Greater Manchester, England
Community-Led Infrastructure Finance Facility (CLIFF), a finance facility managed by Homeless International

See also
Cliffe (disambiguation)
Kliff (disambiguation)
Cliffy (disambiguation)
CLIF (disambiguation)